The Pachhimi are a social group of India. Along with the Purabi, they make up the two branches of the Tharu caste.

Customs
An 1880 record notes:

References

Indian castes